Shilowa may refer to: 
 Mbhazima Shilowa (born 1958), South African politician
 Maria Zhilova (1870-1934), Russian astronomer; the spelling Shilowa was used in naming an asteroid after her